Cettus or Kettos was a deme, or suburb, of ancient Attica of the phyle of Leontis, sending three or four delegates to the  Boule.

Its site is tentatively located near modern Daphni.

References

Populated places in ancient Attica
Former populated places in Greece
Demoi